JDS Takeshio (SS-580) was a. She was commissioned on 5 March 1985.

Construction and career
Takeshio was laid down at Kawasaki Heavy Industries Kobe Shipyard on 3 April 1984 and launched on 9 February 1986. She was commissioned on 3 March 1987, into the 2nd Submarine Group in Yokosuka.

Since June 1988, she has participated in the Exercise RIMPAC '88 in 1988 and became the first Japanese submarine to launch the first Harpoon anti-ship missile underwater.

She left Yokosuka on 9 May 1994 and participated in Exercise RIMPAC '94 with JDS Kurama in 1994.

She was decommissioned on 9 March 2006.

In January 2006, she left Yokosuka for Dokai Bay, where the dismantling site is located.

Citations

1986 ships
Yūshio-class submarines
Ships built by Kawasaki Heavy Industries